Fiachra Ua Focarta (died 1006) was Abbot of Clonfert.

References 

 Annals of Ulster at CELT: Corpus of Electronic Texts at University College Cork
 Annals of Tigernach at CELT: Corpus of Electronic Texts at University College Cork
Revised edition of McCarthy's synchronisms at Trinity College Dublin.
 Byrne, Francis John (2001), Irish Kings and High-Kings, Dublin: Four Courts Press, 

Christian clergy from County Galway
10th-century Irish abbots
1006 deaths
Year of birth unknown